"Don't You Worry My Little Pet" is a song written by Phil Spector for the American pop quartet the Teddy Bears, of which he was a member. It was released in September 1958 as the B-side of the group's "To Know Him Is to Love Him", which topped the Billboard Hot 100.

Background and recording
Spector wrote the upbeat rock and roll song based on his then-current favorite performers, Buddy Holly and the Everly Brothers. It was his first experience with studio recording; the production was achieved by taking a demo tape of the song and playing it back over the studio's speaker system in order to overdub another performance over it. The end product was a cacophony, with stacked harmony vocals that could not be heard clearly. He would develop these methods further, culminating in what would later be dubbed the Wall of Sound.

On May 20, 1958, the song was recorded at Gold Star Studios, Hollywood in a single two-hour session. According to biographer Mick Brown: "Nobody apart from Spector was really convinced the song was any good. [Studio owner] Stan Ross would later dismiss it as 'a piece of crap', and even Anette Kleinbart  thought it was 'dreadful'."

Personnel
The Teddy Bears
Carol Connors (formerly Annette Kleinbard) – vocals
Harvey Goldstein – vocals
Marshall Leib – vocals
Phil Spector – vocals

Art and Dotty Todd version
On November 17, 1958, another version recorded by Art and Dotty Todd was given a four-star rating in Billboard, indicating "very strong sales potential". The publication referred to it a "swingy rocker ... Side moves, and it could get some action."

References

1958 songs
Songs written by Phil Spector
Song recordings with Wall of Sound arrangements